Mujahid is a person engaged in jihad.

Mujahid or variant spellings may also refer to:

Places
 Mujahid Colony, a neighborhood of Liaquatabad Town, Karachi, Sindh, Pakistan
 Muslim Mujahid Colony, a neighborhood of Baldia Town, Karachi, Sindh, Pakistan

People

Given name
 Mujāhid al-ʿĀmirī (died 1044/5), ruler of Dénia in Spain from 1014
 Mujahid Abdul-Karim (born 1944), African-American Islamic scholar and leader
 Mujahid Ali (born 1972), Pakistani politician
 Mujahid Barelvi, Pakistani journalist
 Mujahid Dokubo-Asari (born 1964), Nigerian-Beninese Ijaw activist
 Mujahid ibn Jabr (645–722), early Islamic scholar
 Mujahid Jamshed (born 1971), Pakistani cricketer
 Mujahid Kamran (born 1951), Pakistani theoretical physicist
 Mujahid Miski, Somali wanted by the FBI for terrorist activities
 Mujahid Yusof Rawa (born 1964), Malaysian politician

Surname
 Al-Muhtasib al-Mujahid Hamzah (died 1067), Zaidi imam in Yemen 1060–1067
 Abdul Malik Mujahid (born 1951), Pakistani-American Imam
 Abdullah Mujahid (born 1971), Afghan former Guantanamo inmate 
 Abu Bakr Ibn Mujāhid (859–936), Persian Islamic scholar
 Al-Mujahid, Ayyubid emir of Homs, 1186–1240
 Alamzeb Mujahid, Pakistani comedian
 Basim (singer) (Anis Basim Moujahid born 1992), Danish singer
 Anwar ul Haq Mujahid, Afghan resistance leader
 Dhoruba al-Mujahid bin Wahad (born 1944), American writer and activist
 Fazal Haq Mujahid (1954–1997), Afghan military and political leader
 Jamila Mujahed, Afghan journalist
 Khan Mohammad Mujahid (1961–2011), Afghan police commander 
 Mahmoud Abd Al Aziz Abd Al Mujahid (born 1977), Yemeni citizen held at Guantanamo for 14 years
 Mehdi Mujahid (1988–2022), Afghan Hazara uprising leader
 Nabil Moujahid, Danish singer 
 Nur ibn Mujahid, Emir of Harar, 1550–1567
 Sakhi Dad Mujahid, Afghan insurgent leader
 Zabiullah Mujahid, Afghan Taliban spokesman
 Zoltán Mujahid (born 1979), Pakistani-Hungarian singer and voice teacher

Media
El Moudjahid, an Algerian French-language newspaper
Mojahed, an Iranian weekly originally published from 1979 to 1981
Payam-e-Mojahed, an Iranian monthly published from 1972 to 1978

Other uses
 Mujahid (horse) (foaled 1996), a Thoroughbred racehorse and sire

See also

Mujahideen (disambiguation)
 Jihad (disambiguation)
 Crusader (disambiguation)